Ivan Boldirev (Serbian Cyrillic: Иван Болдирев; born August 15, 1949) is a Serbian Canadian former professional ice hockey player. Boldirev played fifteen seasons and over 1000 games in the NHL from 1970 through 1985. He featured in the 1982 Stanley Cup Finals with the Vancouver Canucks. Boldirev was noted during his career as one of the sport's best stickhandlers.

Amateur career
Born in Zrenjanin, Yugoslavia (now Serbia), Boldirev's family emigrated to Canada when he was two. Growing up in Sault Ste. Marie, Ontario, he was known as a shy child. Boldirev felt that his shyness "probably goes back to when I first came over to Canada and didn't speak any English. My-first grade teacher sent a note home telling my parents that we should speak English at home, but they didn't speak it so they couldn't even read the note!".

Boldirev started playing junior hockey as kid, initially joining his hometown Sault Ste. Marie Greyhounds of the Northern Ontario Junior Hockey League before moving to the Oshawa Generals of the Ontario Hockey Association in 1967-68.

He was the first choice (11th overall) of the Boston Bruins in the 1969 NHL Amateur Draft after two stellar seasons with the Generals.

Professional career
Boldirev turned pro in 1969 and spent his entire first season with Boston's CHL affiliate in Oklahoma City. Boldirev was called up to Boston as a spare body for the 1970 NHL playoffs, but he didn't play a game as Boston romped to their first championship since 1941. However, in a quirk of history, he managed to get his name engraved on the Stanley Cup before he dressed for his first NHL game--the only forward or defencemen ever to do so.  After the 1969-70 season, the NHL tightened its policy so that players must have participated in a playoff game to have their names engraved on the Stanley Cup. 

Boldirev was back in Oklahoma City for the 1970–71, although he received his first NHL action with a two-game callup to the Bruins. During this period, Boston was one of the best, deepest squad in the NHL, and for a young player to crack their roster was a formidable task. Boldirev was in a group of players (Reggie Leach and Rick MacLeish, each of whom would star for Flyers later in the decade, were others) who were good enough to play for many NHL squads but were instead stuck in Boston's system, and would need a trade to get the opportunity they needed.

Boldirev started the 1971–72 as a depth player in Boston, but received his big break partway into the season when he was dealt to the hapless California Golden Seals. On the talent-starved Seals, Boldirev received the chance he needed and blossomed into a solid NHL player, finishing fourth on the team with 16 goals and 41 points. By 1973–74, he finished second on the Seals with 25 goals and 56 points.

In 1974, Boldirev was dealt to the Chicago Black Hawks, where he would go on to the most productive phase of his career. He immediately established himself as one of the team's top players, posting 24 goals and 67 points in 1974–75. He posted 60+ points in each of his five seasons in Chicago, and by the late 1970s had replaced Stan Mikita as the team's top offensive player. He led the Black Hawks in goals, assists, and points in 1976–77 and 1977–78, and was selected to play in the 1978 NHL All-Star Game.

Boldirev was leading the Black Hawks in scoring again in 1978–79 when he was dealt to the Atlanta Flames late in the season in a huge nine–player trade. He contributed 14 points in 13 games after joining the Flames, but his stay in Atlanta would last less than a year before he was dealt to the Vancouver Canucks. Darcy Rota was moved along with Boldirev in both trades, and the two would be teammates (and frequently linemates) for nearly a decade with three different organizations.

After joining the Canucks, Boldirev went on a goal scoring binge to close out the 1979–80 season with 16 goals in 27 games. In Vancouver, he continued to be a consistent productive performer, and continued to dazzle fans with his elegant, effort displays of stickhandling. He was a standout performer in Vancouver's run to the 1982 Stanley Cup Finals, scoring eight goals in 17 games after a 73-point regular season.

Boldirev's production dropped off in the 1982–83 season, as he registered just five goals and 25 points in his first 39 games. Thinking Boldirev (now in his mid-thirties) was in decline, the Canucks sent him to the Detroit Red Wings for journeyman forward Mark Kirton. Boldirev proceeded to undergo a resurgence in Detroit, scoring 13 goals and 30 points in just 33 games with the Wings. In 1983–84, he had the most productive season of his career, matching his career high of 35 goals and setting a career high of 83 points. Boldirev combined with rookie Steve Yzerman to form an excellent one-two punch down the middle, and helped Detroit back to the playoffs for the first time since 1978.

In 1984–85, Boldirev played in his 1000th NHL game and notched his 500th assist, but his production waned as he failed to notch 50 points for the first time since 1973. He retired at the end of the season with career totals of 361 goals and 505 assists for 866 points in 1052 NHL games.  He currently does periodic work on behalf of the Blackhawk Alumni Association.

Career statistics

Awards and accomplishments
Played in NHL-All Star game 1978
OHL Second All-Star Team, 1969

See also
List of NHL players with 1,000 games played

References

External links

Picture of Ivan Boldirev's Name on the 1970 Stanley Cup Plaque

1949 births
Atlanta Flames players
Boston Bruins draft picks
Boston Bruins players
California Golden Seals players
Canadian ice hockey centres
Serbian people of Russian descent
Canadian people of Serbian descent
Canadian people of Russian descent
Chicago Blackhawks players
Detroit Red Wings players
Living people
National Hockey League first-round draft picks
Sault Ste. Marie Greyhounds players
Oshawa Generals players
Sportspeople from Zrenjanin
Sportspeople from Sault Ste. Marie, Ontario
Stanley Cup champions
Vancouver Canucks players
Yugoslav emigrants to Canada
Yugoslav ice hockey centres
Ice hockey people from Ontario